Jozef Škvarek (born 19 August 1963) is a Slovak luger. He competed in the men's singles event at the 1994 Winter Olympics.

References

External links
 
 

1963 births
Living people
Slovak male lugers
Olympic lugers of Slovakia
Lugers at the 1994 Winter Olympics
Sportspeople from Poprad